Guts of Man (Traditional Chinese: 肝膽崑崙), also called Courageous Kunlun, was a Hong Kong TVB costume action series produced by Tommy Leung Choi Yuen.  20 episodes were produced for the series in 2004.

Plot
Dung Fei (Sammul Chan) and Seung Foon (Ron Ng) becomes friends after a couple of head collisions, and after meeting a wealthy business man's daughter, Ying Hiu Suet (Mandy Cho), the three eventually become good friends. Foon was starting to have feelings for Hiu Suet and Fei tries to help him out, but he also ends up falling in love with her. Meanwhile, Fei and his sister Dung Lam (Joyce Koi) finds out that their father's death was uncleared, so they decided to look into that, unveiling more than they can handle.

Cast
Sammul Chan - Tung Fei
Ron Ng - Seung Foon
Mandy Cho - Ying Hiu Suet
Joyce Koi - Dung Lam
Louisa So - Yan Dan Fung
Yuen Wah - Dik Ying Wai
Kwok Fung - Ying Jin Tong
Savio Tsang - Au Yeung Sok
Lee Ka Sing

Airdates
Guts of Man aired in May 2005 on overseas channels.  It did not air on the TVB Jade channel.

TVB dramas
Hong Kong wuxia television series
2005 Hong Kong television series debuts